Paul Richard Alexander (born 1946) is an American lawyer and paralytic polio survivor. He is popularly known as one of the last people living in an iron lung after he contracted polio in 1952 at the age of six.

Background and education 
Alexander contracted polio at the age of six and was paralyzed for life, only able to move his head, neck, and mouth.

During a major U.S. outbreak of polio in the early 1950s, hundreds of children around Dallas, Texas, including Alexander, were taken to Parkland Hospital. There, children were treated in a ward of iron lungs. He almost died in the hospital before a doctor noticed he was not breathing and rushed him into an iron lung.
Beginning in 1954, with help from the March of Dimes and a physical therapist named Mrs. Sullivan, Alexander taught himself glossopharyngeal breathing which allowed him to leave the iron lung for gradually increasing periods of time.
Alexander was one of Dallas Independent School District's first homeschooled students. He learned to memorize instead of taking notes. At 21, he graduated second in his class from W.W. Samuell High in 1967, becoming the first person to graduate from a Dallas high school without physically attending a class.

Alexander received a scholarship to Southern Methodist University. He transferred to University of Texas at Austin, where he earned a bachelor's degree in 1978, then a Juris Doctor in 1984. He got a job teaching legal terminology to court stenographers at an Austin trade school before being admitted to the bar in 1986.

Alexander has been recognised by Guinness World Records as the person who has spent the longest amount of time living in an iron lung.

Book 
Alexander self-published his memoir, Three Minutes for a Dog: My Life in an Iron Lung, in April 2020 with the assistance of friend Norman D. Brown RN (retired). According to The Guardian, they said "It took him more than eight years to write it, using the plastic stick and a pen to tap out his story on the keyboard, or dictating the words to his friend."

References

External links 
Interview with Paul Alexander (YouTube, 2022-11-10)

1946 births
Living people
20th-century American lawyers
21st-century American lawyers
American writers
People with polio
University of Texas School of Law alumni